The Luzon montane forest mouse (Apomys datae)  is a species of rodent in the family Muridae, from the genus Apomys.
It occurs only in the Philippines, where it has been found on the large northern island Luzon (in the Cordillera Central and on the coast of Ilocos Norte). It is most closely related to the large Mindoro forest mouse, which occurs on Mindoro. There may be another related species in the Sierra Madre, but this species is yet undescribed. The Luzon montane forest mouse is a relatively large, ground-dwelling rat with a tail that is quite short for its genus.

Discovery
The Luzon montane forest mouse was the first species of Apomys ever to be discovered. In 1895, an expedition was organised which brought to Europe the first specimens of several genera, including Carpomys, Rhynchomys and Crunomys. In 1898, British biologist Oldfield Thomas described these animals as an "interesting species", but identified them as Mus chrysocomus, a species from Sulawesi that is now known as yellow-haired hill rat (Bunomys chrysocomus) and reckoned among the genus Bunomys, which is not actually closely related to Apomys. Thomas sent a specimen to the Staatliches Museum für Tierkunde Dresden, where Adolf Bernard Meyer concluded that the animal did not resemble Mus chrysocomus. Meyer described th animal as Mus datae in 1899, after its type locality – Mount Data (at the time the generic name Mus was used more broadly than it is now). For a long time, little was known about Mus datae, until 1913, when American biologist Ned Hollister described eight rats from Luzon under the name Epimys datae ("Epimys" was the name of the genus that would later become Rattus). These were in fact examples of the Himalayan field rat (Rattus nitidus), but they were only identified as such in 1977, by Guy Musser, another American biologist. Meanwhile, in Britain, John Ellerman had finally placed Mus datae with its relatives in Apomys, in 1941. Eleven years later, in 1952, American zoologist Colin Campbell Sanborn announced that he had captured 54 specimens of A. datae on Mount Data. A good part of this catch, however, was later found to consist of specimens of the Luzon Cordillera forest mouse (A. abrae), a species which had been described by Sanborn in the same article in which he had made his announcement.

In a 1982 article, Musser defined the genus Apomys and gave the first modern description of A. datae, while also correcting Sanborn's mistake in the identification of his collection. It was revealed that Sanborn had not been the only one to get the major species of Apomys from Luzon confused: the holotype of the species Apomys Major, described by Gerrit Smith Miller Jr. of the Smithsonian Institution in 1910, turned out to have been a specimen of A. datae, while the other animals to have been identified as A. major were discovered to be examples of A. abrae. Since that time, Apomys major has been considered a subjective synonym of A. datae. Musser identified A. datae as the only member of the "Apomys datae group" within the genus, being different from all other species. A second species within the A. datae group was described by Luis Ruedas, in 1995: Apomys gracilirostris. In the 21st century, the knowledge about A. datae was expanded with data from genetic research. In 2002, the karyotype was revealed, and in 2003, the phylogenetic relationship with A. gracilirostris was confirmed, based on common features in the species' DNA. Most recently, the animal has been found on several new locations in North Luzon.

Evolution and phylogenetic relationships
The Luzon montane forest mouse belongs to the Chrotomys division, a group within the Murinae that occurs exclusively on the Philippines, and in addition to Apomys, also includes Rhynchomys, Chrotomys and Archboldomys. Animals in this division share several morphological and genetic features. Within this group, Apomys is by far the biggest and most extensive genus, containing small, inconspicuous wood mice which are common to the whole of the Philippines, while the other, more specialized genera are barely ever found outside Luzon. Apomys itself was divided into two groups, in the aforementioned article by Musser from 1982: the datae group, containing only A. datae, and the abrae-hylocetes group, containing all other species. Animals in these two groups differ in the way in which the head is supplied with blood from arteries. Since the publication of Musser's article, another species has been described that falls into the datae group: A. gracilirostris. This relationship is further supported by other similarities: both species are relatively large for the genus and have a relatively long snout.

In 2003, a phylogenetic study was published which compared DNA sequences from the cytochrome b gene of thirteen species of Apomys. This study confirmed the proposed relationship between the large Mindoro forest mouse (A. gracilirostris) and the Luzon montane forest mouse (A. datae), as well as the status of the datae group as a sister group of the other species of Apomys.

The phylogenetic relationships of the Luzon montane forest mouse can be summarized as follows.

According to this study, the split between the Luzon montane forest mouse and the large Mindoro forest mouse took place some three million years ago, as calculated using a molecular clock, putting it in the pliocene. It was also estimated that Apomys dates back more than four million years, with the Chromotys division being again more ancient by another two million years. Another, more elaborate study concluded that the Chromotys division was older still, at more than ten million years, and that the split between the Chromotys division and its closest relatives, a predominantly African group including Mus, Otomys and Mastomys, took place some sixteen million years ago. Seeing as Apomys probably originated on Luzon, the Luzon montane forest mouse likely developed directly from the ancestor species of the datae group, while the large Mindoro forest mouse is the result of a pliocene migration to Mindoro.

Identification
The genus Apomys, of which the Luzon montane forest mouse is a member, can be identified by its small size, long tail, elongate, narrow hind feet, the presence of four abdominal mammary glands, and a large number of skull characteristics.

The Luzon montane forest mouse is a large, thickset species with a tail that is about the same length as the body. The soft, thick dorsal fur is dark brown, while the ventral side of the body is a cream white. The hind feet are partly brown in colour on the dorsal side, but otherwise white. The tail is brown on the dorsal side, and a cream white ventrally. The animal has a large skull with a square-shaped neurocranium. Some of its skull characteristics are so special that they set the animal apart from most every other species of Apomys. One specimen has a head-torso-length of 143 mm, a tail length of 144 mm and a hind feet length of 34 mm. The specimens captured by Sanborn on Mount Data have a mean skull length of 39.2 mm (37.0 to 40.6 mm with a standard deviation of 1.1 mm). The Luzon montane forest mouse's holotype has a skull length of 39.9 mm; that of A. major has a length of 38.4 mm.

The animal has a karyotype of 2n=44 and FN=54, which consists of five pairs of four-armed chromosomes and sixteen pairs of two-armed (telocentric) chromosomes. The X-chromosome is a large, and the Y-chromosome a small telocentric chromosome. This karyotype has much in common with that of the least forest mouse (Apomys musculus), while at the same time being very different from the karyotypes of species form other parts of the Philippines (the karyotype of the large Mindoro forest mouse, on a side note, is unknown).

Notes and references

Sources

Rats of Asia
Apomys
Endemic fauna of the Philippines
Fauna of Luzon
Rodents of the Philippines
Mammals described in 1899
Taxonomy articles created by Polbot